Stavros Konstantinou (Σταύρος Κωνσταντίνου) (born 25 August 1984 in Nicosia, Cyprus) is a Greek Cypriot singer who rose to popularity after winning Super Idol, the Greek version of Pop Idol, shown by MEGA TV in 2004, in its only season under that name. The program was reintroduced as  Greek Idol in 2010.

Super Idol performances

Semi-finals: Dodeka
Top 10: To party
Top 9: Tha Pio Apopse To Feggari
Top 8: Pali Tha Klapso
Top 7: Kapies Anoites Agapes
Top 6: Apopse
Top 5: Conte Partiro
Top 4: Apopse lew na min kimithoume
Top 3: Mia anapnoi
Grand Final: Den To Anteho
Grand Final: Mi me ksipnas
Grand Final: Apopse

Discography
2004: Super Idol 2004
2005: To Koudouni
2006: Tha' Mai Zitas
2007: Fotia O Erotas
2009: I Agapi Mou Gia Sena

Single
2011 – Den Boro Na Se Xehaso
2012 – Oso Yparheis Tha Yparho
2012 – Poso Na Ypokritho
2013 – Ponese Me
2014 – A Re Nyhta
2015 – Eho Thema Sovaro
2016 – Ta 'Spasa
2016 – Sta Asteria Ekane Premiera – Gia Ton Pantelo
2017 – Ston Theo Me Ftaneis
2018 – Savvato Vrady (duets: Giouri Do)
2018 – Eleges
2019 – Eheis Dyo Lepta

External links
Unofficial Fansite

1984 births
Living people
21st-century Cypriot male singers
Idols (TV series) winners
Super Idol (Greek TV series)